Georg Jann (17 January 1934 – 12 February 2019) was a German organ builder.

Early life 
Jann was born in Kalkberge. In 1948, he began apprenticeship in Potsdam with organ builder Alexander Schuke. He and his family moved on from 1961 to Switzerland, West Berlin and Regensburg. There he took over the workshop of the long-established organ builder Eduard Hirnschrodt in the Regensburg district of Stadtamhof in 1974. The first work in the new workshop was an organ in 1975 for the community of Etzelwang. A short time later, the company received the first orders for a three-manual organ with 40 registers. In 1980 the first four-manual organ for the Church of St. Joseph in Memmingen was completed with 52 registers. Later, the workshop was relocated to south of Allkofen near Regensburg in Bavaria.

Until 1995, Georg Jann ran his company under the name "Georg Jann Orgelbau Meisterbetrieb". He then handed the company to his son  Thomas, who moved the workshop to Portugal. At the end of 2005, he also handed this company called "Orguian", to Detlef Jann, his oldest son.

Selected works

References

German pipe organ builders
1934 births
2019 deaths
Musical instrument manufacturing companies of Germany